Yersi is a rural locality (a selo) and the administrative center of Yersinsky Selsoviet, Tabasaransky District, Republic of Dagestan, Russia. The population was 1,807 as of 2010. There are 10 streets.

Geography 
Yersi is located 13 km northeast of Khuchni (the district's administrative centre) by road. Zil and Darvag are the nearest rural localities.

References 

Rural localities in Tabasaransky District